Madison Taylor Shipman (born June 25, 1992) is an American, former professional softball player. She played college softball at Tennessee.

Playing career
She attended Valencia High School and she later attended the University of Tennessee, where she played for the Tennessee Volunteers softball team from 2011-2014. She led the Volunteers to the 2013 Women's College World Series championship where they finished as runner up to the Oklahoma Sooners. She was later selected 2nd overall in the 2014 National Pro Fastpitch Senior Draft and went on to be named Rookie of The Year and win the 2014 championship with the USSSA Pride.

Shipman led Tennessee to back-to-back Women's College World Series appearances in 2012 and 2013. In 2013, Tennessee advanced to the Women's College World Series finals, where they lost to Oklahoma, 2–0. As a senior in 2014, she won the Senior CLASS Award for softball and the SEC Player of the Year award. She also won the Honda Sports Award as the nation's top softball player. She later went on to play professional softball with the USSSA Pride and the Scrap Yard Dawgs of National Pro Fastpitch.

Statistics

Tennessee Lady Vols

References

External links
 
Tennessee Volunteers bio
USA Softball Bio
USSSA Pride bio

1992 births
American softball players
Tennessee Volunteers softball players
Softball players from California
Living people
People from Santa Clarita, California
Scrap Yard Dawgs players
USSSA Pride players